Jack Thornton (August 31, 1914 – December 13, 2007) was an American professional basketball player. He played in the National Basketball League for the Hammond Ciesar All-Americans in one game and for the Sheboygan Red Skins in two games. Thornton scored five total points.

References

External links
 

1914 births
2007 deaths
American men's basketball players
Basketball players from Texas
Centers (basketball)
Forwards (basketball)
Hammond Ciesar All-Americans players
High school basketball coaches in Texas
High school football coaches in Texas
People from Gatesville, Texas
Sheboygan Red Skins players
Texas Wesleyan Rams men's basketball players
United States Army Air Forces personnel of World War II